Ernestine von Kirchsberg (12 August 1857, Verona, Italy – 8 October 1924, Graz, Austria) was an Austrian landscape painter.

Biography
She was born in Italy. It is not known why her parents were there. Back in Graz, she began taking art lessons in 1873 at the "Landschaftliche Zeichenakademie" (Landscape Drawing Academy) with Hermann von Königsbrunn. After 1881, she studied at the Academy of Fine Arts, Vienna, with Eduard Peithner von Lichtenfels, August Schaeffer and Hugo Darnaut. Her first exhibit followed shortly, at the Vienna Künstlerhaus.

It was Darnaut who most influenced her style; an atmospheric school of landscape painting peculiar to Austria, known as "". While in Vienna, she befriended Marie Egner and  Alfred Zoff, who she later followed to Munich. There, she completed her apprenticeship with him and Adalbert Waagen, a student of Albert Zimmermann. She also took up watercolors and was initially best known for her work in that genre.

In 1893, she was awarded a prize at the World’s Columbian Exposition in Chicago. She later exhibited frequently in Vienna, Berlin, Prague, Graz and elsewhere; making numerous painting expeditions to the Adriatic, Styria, Carniola and the South Tyrol.

Sources 

 
 Manfred Srna (Ed.), Kunsthandel, Gesamtkatalog der Gemälde, Aquarelle und Zeichnungen, Österreichische Gemälde des 19. und 20. Jh., Graz 2009,

External links 

ArtNet: More works by Kirchsberg.

1857 births
1924 deaths
Austrian women painters
Artists from Graz
Austrian landscape painters
19th-century Austrian painters
20th-century Austrian painters
19th-century Austrian women artists
20th-century Austrian women artists